Osakarovka is a settlement in Sarybel District, Karaganda Region, Kazakhstan. It is the only populated center of the Osakarovka rural district (KATO code - 355630100). Osakarovka was established in 1908 by Ukrainian peasants. Population:

Geography
The Astana — Karaganda highway passes through Osakarovka. There is also a railway station of the Astana - Karaganda line in the town.

References

External links
«Kazan Temple» -  Karaganda Diocese of the Russian Orthodox Church of the Metropolitan District in the Republic of Kazakhstan (in Russian)

Populated places in Karaganda Region

kk:Осакаровка